The 2013 V.League 1 (known as the Eximbank V.League 1 for sponsorship reasons) season was the 57th season of Vietnam's professional football league and began on 3 March 2013 and finished on 31 August 2013.

Changes from last season

Team changes
The following teams have changed division since the 2012 season.

To V.League 1
Promoted from V.League 2
 Đồng Nai
 Đồng Tâm Long An

From V.League 1
Folded
 Hà Nội
 Khatoco Khánh Hòa F.C.
 Navibank Sài Gòn

Relegated
 TĐCS Đồng Tháp

Rule changes
After a 5-year absence, the AFC announced that the V.League 1 champions would be allowed to compete in the 2014 AFC Champions League playoff stage.

Teams 
Number of participating clubs in the 2013 campaign is 12.

Vicem Hải Phòng's relegation to the 2013 Vietnamese First Division season was confirmed on 29 July 2012. However, the club returned to the V.League for the 2013 season to replace Khatoco Khánh Hòa, who were dissolved on 8 December 2012.

TĐCS Đồng Tháp were relegated after rivals Khatoco Khánh Hòa defeated Sông Lam Nghệ An 1–0 on 19 August 2012.

Đồng Tâm Long An (as Champions) and Hà Nội T&T Youth (as runners-up) secured direct promotion to the V.League from the 2012 Vietnamese First Division. Đồng Tâm Long An returned to the V.League after a one-season absence. However, Hà Nội T&T Youth remained in the second tier of Vietnamese football due to league rules about clubs with the same owners competing in the same division.

Hà Nội was dissolved on 27 November 2012 when club officials could not secure a new sponsor after the earlier arrest of Chairman Nguyen Duc Kien caused all sponsorship from his assets to be blocked. Navibank Sài Gòn was sold on 22 October 2012 after the title sponsor of the club announced the a move away from sports, but the new owners announced on 5 December 2012 that the club would be dissolved before the start of the 2013 campaign., finally this club was dissolved.

On 8 December 2012, the VPF had stated that the Vietnam U22 team would be added to the V.League to gain experience ahead of the 2013 Southeast Asian Games and to bring the participating number of clubs to 12. However, the Vietnam Football Federation announced on December 13, 2012 that 2012 Vietnamese First Division second runners-up Đồng Nai would be the twelfth club in the 2013 campaign.

Controversy
After Xuân Thành Sài Gòn was docked points for what the VFF deemed the club unsportsmanlike conduct when the club fielded a noncompetitive squad for their Matchdat 20 meeting with Sông Lam Nghệ An, club officials announced that the club would withdraw from the league. On August 22, 2013, the VFF approved Xuân Thành Sài Gòn's withdrawal request. Matches where the club was involved were vacated. The VFF is still debating if the last place club will still be relegated to V.League 2, though the league charter states that the club in 12th place would be the only club relegated in the 2013 campaign.

Stadia and locations

Personnel and kits

Note: Flags indicate national team as has been defined under FIFA eligibility rules. Players and Managers may hold more than one non-FIFA nationality.

Managerial changes

Foreign players

Note:
1Those players who were born and started their professional career abroad but have since gained Vietnamese Residency;
2Foreign residents who have chosen to represent Vietnam national team;
3Vietnamese residents who have chosen to represent another national team

League table

Results

Summary

Details

Match-day 1

Match-day 2

Match-day 3

Match-day 4

Match-day 5

Match-day 6

Match-day 7

Match-day 8

Match-day 9

Match-day 10

Match-day 11

Match-day 12

Match-day 13

Match-day 14

Match-day 15

Match-day 16

Match-day 17

Match-day 18

Match-day 19

Match-day 20

Match-day 21

Match-day 22

Season statistics

Top scorers

Hat-tricks

*: Scored four goals

Scoring
First goal of the season: Gonzalo for Hà Nội T&T against Hoàng Anh Gia Lai (2 March 2013)
Fastest goal of the season: 1 minute, Abass Cheikh Dieng for Thanh Hóa against Kienlongbank Kiên Giang (27 April 2013)
Largest winning margin: 8 goals
Sông Lam Nghệ An 8–0 Đồng Tâm Long An (30 June 2013)
Highest scoring game: 8 goals
Sông Lam Nghệ An 8–0 Đồng Tâm Long An (30 June 2013)
Most goals scored in a match by a single team: 8 goals
Sông Lam Nghệ An 8–0 Đồng Tâm Long An (30 June 2013)
Most goals scored in a match by a losing team: 3 goals
Becamex Bình Dương 3–4 Thanh Hóa (26 May 2013)
Vicem Hải Phòng 3–4 Đồng Tâm Long An (21 July 2013)
Vissai Ninh Bình 3-4 Đồng Tâm Long An (3 August 2013)

Clean sheets
Most clean sheets: 8
SHB Đà Nẵng
Fewest clean sheets: 0
Kienlongbank Kiên Giang

Discipline
Most yellow cards (club): 62
 Sông Lam Nghệ An F.C.
Most yellow cards (player): 10
Nguyễn Quốc Long (Hà Nội T&T)
Most red cards (club): 6
 Thanh Hóa F.C.
Most red cards (player): 2
Cao Sỹ Cường (Hà Nội T&T)
Nguyễn Quốc Long (Hà Nội T&T)
Trần Thanh Tuấn (XM Vicem Hải Phòng)
Đoàn Việt Cường (XM Xuân Thành Sài Gòn)

Attendance

Awards

Annual awards

Top scorer
 Gonzalo Damian Marronkle (Hà Nội T&T)
 Samson Kayode Olaleye (Hà Nội T&T)

Manager of the Season
 Phan Thanh Hùng (Hà Nội T&T)

Best player of the Season
 Gonzalo Damian Marronkle (Hà Nội T&T)

Best Young player of the Season
 Trần Minh Vương (HAGL)

Best Referee
 Nguyễn Trọng Thư

Monthly awards

Dream Team

References

External links
 Official Page

Vietnamese Super League seasons
Vietnam
Vietnam
1